Mercy is a 2016 American thriller film written and directed by Chris Sparling. The film had its world premiere at Los Angeles Film Festival on June 4, 2016, and its distribution rights were acquired by Netflix.

Plot

Grace (Constance Barron) is dying. That much is clear. She is laid up in a hospital bed on the second floor of her farmhouse as her husband George (Dan Ziskie) does his best to take care of her. One day, a mysterious man knocks on the front door and thrusts a medical bag into George's hands, pleading with him to use what's inside and end the woman's suffering. George reluctantly takes it and slams the door in the man's face.

We come to learn that Grace has four sons, two with George and two with her abusive ex-husband, a man who died and left a fortune in trust to Grace, meant to go to Brad (James Wolk) and Travis (Tom Lipinski), the sons of her first marriage, though George and the other two sons, Ronnie (Michael Godere) and TJ (Michael Donovan) are looking to squeeze them out. When they all come together as Grace seems near to her end, tensions surface, more so as Brad has brought along his new girlfriend Melissa (Caitlin FitzGerald) for support, to which everyone else seems outright appalled.

As the evening passes, a curious mention of something between the family is alluded to, and how whatever is in the black bag will end her pain but the decision to do so is not easy. When Melissa asks why, the response is left unheard. It's not long after when the property comes under invasion of masked figures who attack the home, having Brad, Melissa, and Travis retreat into Grace's room to try and hold them off. The masked men abandon their efforts to get in the room and instead head back outside where the write word ‘Mercy’ in fire on the front lawn. They stand their ground and wait while Brad, Travis, and Melissa argue over what to do next. Choices are made, actions taken, a single puzzle piece falls upon the ground and a man is shot.

When morning comes, we soon realize it is not the next day but in fact the same as the previous, played out again but now from a different perspective. This time, some gaps are filled and some questions answered, shifting everything we thought we knew about the brothers, the black bag, and even Grace.

Cast
 James Wolk as Brad
 Caitlin FitzGerald as Melissa 
 Tom Lipinski as Travis 
 Dan Ziskie as George 
 Michael Godere as Ronnie 
 Michael Donovan as TJ 
 Dion Graham as Dr. Turner
 Constance Barron as Grace

Production

Reception

See also
 List of films featuring home invasions

References

External links
 
 

2016 films
American mystery thriller films
American drama films
2010s thriller films
Home invasions in film
2010s English-language films
2010s American films